John J. Eppig is professor emeritus at the Jackson Laboratory in Bar Harbor, Maine. He studies the development and function of the oocyte-granulosa cell complex in mammals. He is the first researcher to achieve the first complete development of mammalian oocytes in vitro. He is a member of the National Academy of Sciences.

Early life and education 
Eppig was born in 1943. His father was a pediatrician and his mother was a homemaker with a master's degree in English.  He received his B.S. in biology from Villanova University, and a Ph.D. in endocrinology from the Catholic University of America. He did research for his doctorate at the Molecular Anatomy Program of Oak Ridge National Laboratory, and did a postdoctoral fellowship at University of Tennessee at Oak Ridge in developmental biology.

Career 
He was an assistant professor.at Brooklyn College in New York for three years. In 1975 he became an assistant professor at the Jackson Laboratory until he retired in 2013.

Honors 
In 2011 Eppig was elected to the National Academy of Sciences.

References 

Living people
1943 births
Members of the United States National Academy of Sciences
Villanova University alumni
Catholic University of America alumni
21st-century American biologists
20th-century American biologists
Cell biologists
American biologists